Aneil Kanhai (born 12 April 1982) is a Trinidadian cricketer. He played in twenty-four first-class and five List A matches for Trinidad and Tobago from 2001 to 2012.

See also
 List of Trinidadian representative cricketers

References

External links
 

1982 births
Living people
Trinidad and Tobago cricketers